The San Joaquín Municipality is one of the 14 municipalities (municipios) that makes up the Venezuelan state of Carabobo and, according to the 2011 census by the National Institute of Statistics of Venezuela, the municipality has a population of 64,124. The town of San Joaquín is the municipal seat of the San Joaquín Municipality.

Location
It borders Aragua State to the north, the Lake Valencia to the south, the Diego Ibarra Municipality to the east, and the Guacara Municipality to the west.

Demographics
The San Joaquín Municipality, according to a 2007 population estimate by the National Institute of Statistics of Venezuela, has a population of 60,953 (up from 48,946 in 2000). This amounts to 2.7% of the state's population.

Government
The mayor of the San Joaquín Municipality is Luis Aguiar, elected on November 23, 2008, with 55% of the vote. He replaced César Emilio Hernández Meza shortly after the elections. The municipality is divided into one parish (San Joaquín).

Tradition
The municipality is well known for its local biscuits, the "panelas of San Joaquín".

See also
San Joaquín
Carabobo
Municipalities of Venezuela

References

Municipalities of Carabobo